Renato Carosone (born Renato Carusone; 3 January 1920 – 20 May 2001) was an Italian musician.

He was a prominent figure of the Italian music scene in the second half of the 20th century. He was also a modern performer of the so-called canzone napoletana, a traditional music genre from Naples. His biggest successes were: "'O Sarracino", "Caravan Petrol", "Tu Vuò Fà L'Americano", "Maruzzella" and "Pigliate na' pastiglia".

Carosone was one of the first post-war Italian artists (the other one being Domenico Modugno) who sold records and toured in the United States without singing in English.

Biography

Beginnings
Carosone was born in Naples, the older of three siblings. His father, who worked in a theatre box office, encouraged him to pursue music. He studied piano and composition at the Naples Conservatory and obtained his diploma in 1937, when he was just 17. A few months later he signed a contract to perform as a band leader in Eritrea. Carosone worked at the Odeon Club in Addis Ababa, where he become a prominent figure of the local music scene, performing a combination of big-band music, Napoletan songs and Eritrean percussive elements.

In 1938 Carosone met dancer Lita Levidi in Addis Ababa. The two fell in love and eventually got married. Carosone adopted her son, Pino.

At the outbreak of World War II, Carosone was drafted to fight in Ethiopia. In 1946, at the end of the war, he returned to Italy.

Partially due to his long tenure abroad and the years of inactivity caused by the war, Carosone discovered to be virtually unknown in his home country. He started his career afresh, playing piano for small dance-hall bands. These new performances were strongly influenced by the new rhythms and music styles he had encountered during his ten years in Eritrea and caught the attention of local promoters.

Success

In 1949 Carosone was asked to put together a band for a club's opening night. After some auditions, he signed the Dutch guitarist Peter van Houten and the Neapolitan drummer Gegè Di Giacomo and formed the Trio Carosone. The trio would later become a quartet with the addition of the Hungarian romani musician Elek Bacsik on bass, guitar and violin.

During the 1950s Carosone became more and more popular, his orchestra was in great demand both in Italy and abroad, and records sales were soaring high.

His song "Torero", entered the charts in the United States in the summer of 1958. "Torero" was translated into twelve languages and covered by almost thirty artists in the United States alone, including versions by The Andrews Sisters, Connie Francis and The King Brothers. In 1957 Carosone and his band embarked on an American tour, kicking off in Cuba. This tour concluded with a triumphant performance at the prestigious Carnegie Hall in New York City.

Carosone was then signed by Capitol Records, which released his first two albums: Honeymoon in Rome (1957) and Renato Carosone! (1959). He then moved to Pathé and recorded Blue Italian Skies (1958). His fourth studio album, Carnevale Carosone (1960) was released by Parlophone.

Retirement
At the height of his career, Carosone announced his retirement from music in 1960. He felt that the advent of Rock and roll had the consequence of making his swing, big-band sound no longer popular: "I'd rather retire now on the crest of the wave, than being tormented later by the idea of rock and roll wiping away all that I have achieved in so many years of hard work". His decision to retire caused an uproar. Some observers even suspected obscure underworld threats. Away from the spotlight, Carosone turned to other interests, mainly painting. In 2007 the Castel Sant'Angelo Museum in Rome organized a large exhibition of his work.

Comeback
On 9 August 1975 Carosone made his comeback in a televised concert. He then resumed his musical career with live concerts, performances at the Sanremo Music Festival and TV appearances until the late 1990s.

Repertoire
The majority of Carosone's songs were the result of his long and fruitful collaboration with the lyricist Nicola Salerno, who used the pseudonym Nisa. "'O suspiro", "Torero", "Tu vuò fà l'americano", "Mambo Italiano", "Caravan Petrol", "Pigliate 'na pastiglia" and "'O Sarracino" were among their greatest hits.

A few famous songs not co-written by Nisa were "...E la barca tornò sola" (a parody of a song performed by Gino Latilla at Sanremo Music Festival in 1954); "Tre numeri al lotto"; "Maruzzella" (dedicated to his wife); and "'O russo e 'a rossa'"

Death
Carosone died on 20 May 2001 at the age of 81 in Rome, Italy.

Discography
Honeymoon in Rome (1958)
Blue Italian Skies (1958)
Renato Carosone (1959)
Carnevale Carosone (1960)
Pianofortissimamente Carosone (1975)
Sempre (1982)
Nu' canzoncella doce doce (1982)

See also 
 Tu Vuò Fà L'Americano
 We No Speak Americano

References

Further reading 
 Scuderi, Antonio. "Okay Napulitan!: Social Change and Cultural Identity in the Songs of Renato Carosone." Italica, Vol. 87. No. 4 (2010) : 619-36.

1920 births
2001 deaths
Italian bandleaders
Italian male singer-songwriters
Musicians from Naples
Neapolitan language
20th-century Italian male singers
Italian pianists
Italian jazz musicians